Jo-Ann Archibald, also known as Q’um Q’um Xiiem , is an Indigenous studies scholar from the Sto:lo First Nation in British Columbia, Canada.

Archibald completed her Bachelor of Education at the University of British Columbia (UBC) in 1972, followed by her Master's degree and Ph.D. at Simon Fraser University. Archibald was a member of the Board of Directors at the First Nations House of Learning at UBC and was also its Director from 1993 to 2001.

Archibald is a former Associate Dean for Indigenous Education in Educational studies at UBC and a supervisor for the Native Indigenous Teacher Education Program (NITEP) from 1985 to 1992. Archibald was the Director for the International Research Institute for Maori and Indigenous Education after she established a formal relationship between the UBC and the University of Auckland. Archibald focuses a lot of her research on the importance of indigenous story work in the classroom.

Achievements 
Archibald received the Justice Achievement Award in 1995 from the National Association for Court Management for her development of First Nations justice curriculum.  In 2000 she won the National Aboriginal Achievement Award for Education. The American Educational Research Association awarded her the Scholars of Color Distinguished Career Contribution Award in 2013.

Work 
Archibald has frequently published work and has sat on many advisory boards for different books. These books include 
Bridging Two Peoples: Chief Peter E. Jones, 1943-1909 by Allan Sherwin, 
Aboriginal Peoples in Canadian Cities: Transformations and Continuities edited by Heather A. Howard, and Craig Proulx, 
Indigenous Politics in Canada edited by Neal McLeod, 
The Nature of Empires and the Empires of Nature: Indigenous Peoples and the Great Lakes Environment edited by Karl S. Hele, 
Arts of Engagement: Taking Aesthetic Action in and Beyond Canada’s Truth and Reconciliation Commission edited by Dylan Robinson and Keavy Martin, 
Literary Land Claims: The "Indian Land Question" from Pontiac’s War to Attawapiskat by Margery Fee,
Learn, Teach, Challenge: Approaching Indigenous Literatures edited by Deanna Reder and Linda M. Morra.

Books 
 Indigenous Storywork: Educating the Heart, Mind, Body, and Spirit
 Learning, Knowing, Sharing: Celebrating Successes in K-12 Aboriginal Education in British Columbia

Articles 
 Transforming First Nations Research With Respect and Power
 Introduction: Through Our Eyes and In Our Own Words
 Tracking Education Career Path and Employment Status of BC Teachers of Aboriginal Ancestry Report
 Ravens Response to Teacher Education: NITEP, An Indigenous Story
 Elders’ Teachings About Indigenous Storywork For Education

References 

1950 births
Living people
Sto:lo people
First Nations women writers
Officers of the Order of Canada
Simon Fraser University alumni
University of British Columbia Faculty of Education alumni
Academic staff of the University of British Columbia
20th-century First Nations writers
20th-century Canadian non-fiction writers
21st-century First Nations writers
21st-century Canadian non-fiction writers
Canadian women non-fiction writers
20th-century Canadian women writers
21st-century Canadian women writers
Canadian indigenous women academics
First Nations academics